Televisión Española (acronym TVE, branded tve,  "Spanish Television") is Spain's national state-owned public television broadcaster and the oldest regular television service in the country. It was also the first regular television service in Equatorial Guinea.

TVE began as a standalone company dependent on the Ministry of Information and Tourism. After undergoing numerous restructurings and reorganizations, it is currently the television division, while Radio Nacional de España (RNE) is the radio division, of Radiotelevisión Española (RTVE), the public corporation which has the overall responsibility for the national broadcasting public services under a parliament-appointed president who, in addition to being answerable to a Board of Directors, reports to an all-party committee of the national parliament, as provided for in the Public Radio and Television Law of 2006.

TVE launched its first channel on 28 October 1956 as the first regular television service in Spain. It was the only one until 15 November 1966, when TVE launched a second channel. As TVE held a monopoly on television broadcasting in the country, they were the only television channels until the first regional public television station was launched on 16 February 1983, when Euskal Telebista started broadcasting in the Basque Country. Commercial television was launched on 25 January 1990, when Antena 3 started broadcasting nationwide. On 20 July 1968, TVE also became the first regular television service in Equatorial Guinea, with the inauguration of its broadcasts in the then-Spanish autonomous region of Equatorial Guinea.

Its headquarters and main production center is Prado del Rey in Pozuelo de Alarcón, with additional production centers in San Cugat del Vallés and in the Canary Islands. TVE's news services are located at its Torrespaña facilities, at the foot of the communications tower in Madrid. Although almost all the programming of its channels is in Spanish and is the same for all of Spain, TVE has territorial centers in every autonomous community and produces and broadcasts some local programming in regional variations in each of them in the corresponding co-official language.

TVE's activities were previously financed by a combination of advertising revenue and subsidies from the national government, but since 1 January 2010, it has been supported by subsidies only.

History

1950s 
Televisión Española was established at a building of Paseo de la Habana in Madrid, and after some time of technical tests, its free-to-air black-and-white fullscreen standard-definition monaural live analog terrestrial television transmissions on VHF frequencies were officially launched on 28 October 1956 with a special inaugural program. The next day, three evening hours a day of regular live broadcasting began from its single  studio, becoming the first regular television service in Spain.

An initial news bulletin, called Últimas Noticias, was created within a week and a weather forecast was first aired on 2 November 1956. On 13 January 1957, the first fiction was produced, an adaptation of the 1916 one-act play Before Breakfast by Eugene O'Neill, and in February 1957, the first fiction series, the sitcom Los Tele-Rodríguez. On 15 September 1957, the evening edition of the flagship Telediario newscast was premiered, with the afternoon edition following on 28 April 1958.

On 27 April 1958, TVE aired its first live broadcast from out-of-studio, the 1957–58 La Liga season football match between Atlético Madrid and Real Madrid CF from the Metropolitano Stadium in Madrid. On 12 October 1958, the broadcasting center in Zaragoza was inaugurated and on the first week of February 1959, the broadcasting center in Barcelona began to operate. On 14 July 1959, the Miramar studios in Barcelona were opened.

1960s 
The first TVE production for abroad was the coverage for the European Broadcasting Union (EBU) of the arrival in Madrid of the President of the United States Dwight D. Eisenhower on 21 December 1959. As the link with the Eurovision telecommunications network was not ready yet, it was taped and sent by plane to the nearest Eurovision node in Marseille. Once the link was ready, the first live broadcast from Spain to abroad was the 1959–60 European Cup season football match between Real Madrid and OGC Nice from the Santiago Bernabéu Stadium in Madrid on 2 March 1960 through it. The first live broadcast from abroad to Spain was the second half of the European Cup final match between Real Madrid and Eintracht Frankfurt from Hampden Park in Glasgow on 18 May 1960 through Eurovision. The first full live coverage from abroad to Spain was the Wedding of Baudouin of Belgium and Fabiola de Mora y Aragón from Brussels on 15 December 1960, also through Eurovision. TVE took part in the Eurovision Song Contest for the first time in its  on 18 March 1961 in Cannes, with the song "Estando contigo" by Conchita Bautista.

On 12 February 1964, the Canary Islands production center in Las Palmas was opened. On 18 July 1964, Prado del Rey in Pozuelo de Alarcón was inaugurated to replace the facilities at Paseo de la Habana. It was opened with three studios already in operation and another six studios under construction. Shows and fiction production was soon transferred there, but the news services were not transferred until 1967. In August 1966, the first permanent foreign correspondent was stationed in London, followed in 1968 by the ones in New York, Vienna and Brussels. On 15 November 1966 its second channel was launched on UHF frequencies.

TVE participated in the production of Our World television special with thirteen other national broadcasters from around the world coordinated by the EBU. This was the first live multinational multi-satellite television production ever and it was transmitted to twenty-four countries, including Spain, on 25 June 1967. TVE contributed with a segment, live on board some fishing vessels sailing in the Gulf of Cádiz, showing the work of the fishermen and praising the country's fishing industry.

Televisión Española became also the first regular television service in Equatorial Guinea on 20 July 1968 when it inaugurated its production center at Santa Isabel de Fernando Poo, in the then-Spanish autonomous region of Equatorial Guinea, and began broadcasts. Since there was no television link with Spain, the programming consisted of programs made there and programs sent from Spain on tape. After the country declared independence on 12 October 1968, the new authorities accused it of broadcasting "racist programming" and "imperialist propaganda", and TVE ended up closing the station. Shortly after they resumed their broadcasts as Televisión Nacional de Guinea Ecuatorial (TVGE) but they ceased broadcasting definitively in 1973 and the few remaining Spanish technicians left the country. The Equatoguinean government re-established TVGE in 1979.

It was the second Eurovision Song Contest transmitted in full color, and since TVE did not have the required color equipment at the time, it had to rent it abroad. In Spain itself, the domestic broadcast and the copy that TVE kept in its archives was in black-and-white. The event was transmitted live to the EBU member broadcasters through the Eurovision network, to the International Radio and Television Organisation (OIRT) member broadcasters through the Intervision network and to broadcasters in Chile, Puerto Rico and Brazil via satellite.

1970s 

By 1970, the coverage of TVE's first channel reached almost the entire territory of Spain and that of the second channel the metropolitan areas of the main capitals. On 24 May 1971, the first delegation was opened in Bilbao, followed by the ones in Santiago de Compostela on 25 July 1971 and in Seville on 29 July 1971, which would later become the first territorial centers.

After two years of test transmissions, regular PAL color transmissions started in August 1972 with the Summer Olympics in Munich, with all programming transmitted in color in 1977 and color commercials starting in 1978. A colour test card designed exclusively for TVE by Finn Hendil, under the supervision of Erik Helmer Nielsen from Philips, replaced its previous black-and-white card developed by Eduardo Gavilán.

On 25 November 1972, TVE produced the very first edition of the annual OTI Festival live from the Palacio de Exposiciones y Congresos auditorium in Madrid. The event was transmitted live to the Organización de Televisión Iberoamericana (OTI) member broadcasters via satellite. TVE also produced the sixth edition from the Centro Cultural de la Villa de Madrid on 12 November 1977, the 14h edition from Teatro Lope de Vega in Seville on 21 September 1985 and the 21st, 22nd and 23rd editions from Teatro Principal in Valencia on 5 December 1992, 9 October 1993 and 14–15 October 1994 respectively.

Between 1977 and 1983, TVE produced the weekly variety show 300 millones with the support of OTI. The show was broadcast in Spain and transmitted to the Spanish-language OTI member broadcasters via satellite. It was also broadcast on Spanish-language stations in the Philippines and the Netherlands Antilles.

1980s 

On 23 February 1981, Televisión Española was recording the roll-call vote for the investiture of the country's next Prime Minister at the Congress of Deputies plenary hall when 200 armed Civil Guard officers broke into the building in a coup d'état. The assailants immediately disabled the television cameras by force, but a TVE operator, Pedro Francisco Martín, managed to continue transmitting from one of the four cameras without their noticing. Prado del Rey was receiving the transmission through an internal closed circuit and half an hour of the incident was recorded. Fernando Castedo, General Director of RTVE, hid the tape with the footage inside his chair's cushion and sat on it when some military rebels took Prado del Rey for more than one hour. As soon as they left, he sent two camera crews to the Palace of Zarzuela to record the King's speech repudiating the coup. Each crew returned to Prado del Rey with a copy of the speech in a different car and by different route, escorted by the Royal Guard, and it was broadcast as soon as they arrived. The footage of the assault inside the Congress was not aired until all the deputies were released after the failure of the coup the following day.

TVE was in charge of producing the official live television feed of the 1982 FIFA World Cup, which allowed it to carry out a major modernization with the construction of the Torrespaña telecommunications tower in Madrid and the production center at its foot, which served as International Broadcast Centre during the event, both inaugurated on 7 June 1982. On 27 June 1983, a new production center in Sant Cugat del Vallès replaced the Miramar studios in Barcelona. Also in 1983, the central news services moved to the Torrespaña production center and ever since 14 November, Telediario has been broadcast from there.

On 13 January 1986, weekdays breakfast television broadcasts began. On 16 May 1988, the teletext was incorporated to the broadcast signal, which allowed closed captioning to begin in November 1990.

On 19 May 1989, in response to the European Economic Community (EEC) requirement to separate the natural monopoly of infrastructure management from the competitive operations of running services, and with the imminent arrival of commercial television, TVE's telecommunications network, including the Torrespaña tower, was transferred to Retevisión. While it was already appearing on certain live broadcasts as early as 1982, it was not until November 1989 that the logo bug appeared permanently at the bottom right corner of the screen on its both channels, except during commercials.

1990s 
For the Barcelona 1992 Summer Olympics the Organizing Committee created a host broadcaster expressly, Radio Televisión Olímpica '92 (RTO'92), in order to guarantee that the international signal was produced objectively and impartially. RTO'92 managed the staff and the production and technical resources hired to RTVE, the Corporació Catalana de Ràdio i Televisió (CCRTV) and the EBU. With a workforce of 3,083 people –of which 800 were from TVE–, and over 50 mobile units –15 from TVE–, RTO'92 provided live coverage of all Summer Olympic sports for the first time ever –except for a few preliminary events–, some 2,800 hours of live television footage, to its international rights-holders. Additionally, 500 TVE workers and eight mobile units were in charge of producing TVE's personalized coverage, with La 2 dedicating all its programming exclusively to the Games 24 hours a day. For Catalonia, TVE and Televisió de Catalunya (TVC) joined forces to broadcast the Games also in Catalan, creating the Canal Olímpic, a 24 hours channel in Catalan dedicated exclusively to the Games that occupied TVC's Canal 33 frequency.

The 1992 Olympics were also the first in which a comprehensive coverage in high-definition television (HDTV) was attempted. The European HDTV broadcast of the Summer Olympics was managed by the joint venture "Barcelona 1250" created by RTO'92, RTVE, Retevisión and PESA, with the financial support of the EEC and a workforce of over 300 production and technical staff. TVE was in charge of the planning and lay-out of the technical facilities, all the engineering and the provision of qualified personnel. A total of 225 hours and 45 minutes was broadcast in analog HD-MAC standard in 1,250 lines and 16:9 aspect ratio, with commentary in five languages –Spanish, English, French, German and Italian– in addition to the non-commentary sound track, of eighteen different sports at seventeen venues, as well as the opening and closing ceremonies. Events from five venues were covered live –80% of the total broadcast time– and other events were recorded for a delayed broadcast. On-screen text and graphics were shown in HDTV for the first time ever. Nearly 700 viewing sites installed throughout Europe, including the fifty HDTV receivers installed in various pavilions at the Seville Universal Exposition, were able to receive the broadcast.

On 1 December 1989 TVE international television service, on 12 February 1994 an all-sports channel and on 15 September 1997 an all-news channel were launched. In 1993, stereophonic sound and a sound multiplex for the original language in foreign productions began to be available in the broadcast signal.

2000s 
On 8 August 2008, regular test digital high-definition television transmissions started through TVE HD in 720p with the Summer Olympics in Beijing. On 1 January 2010, TVE stopped broadcasting commercial advertising on all its channels, with only self promotions, institutional campaigns and sponsorships allowed. With analog service discontinued on 3 April 2010, all its terrestrial free-to-air channels have only been available through the digital terrestrial television (DTT) ever since. On 31 December 2013, the first regular HDTV DTT channels were launched, simulcasting La 1 and Teledeporte, initially in 720p and later in 1080i.

TVE broadcast live the 2022 FIFA World Cup in ultra-high-definition (UHD), 4K resolution and HDR quality, free-to-air through the DTT. It was the first UHD HDR broadcast of an event of that complexity and duration through the DTT ever.

Corporate identity

Current television channels 

La 1, La 2, Teledeporte, 24 Horas and Clan are free-to-air channels currently available in Spain through digital terrestrial television in both HDTV and SDTV versions. They broadcast in 1080i and Dolby Digital Plus for the HDTV feed and the signal is downscaled to 16:9 576i stereo for the SDTV feed. TVE Internacional, 24 Horas Internacional and Clan Internacional are available abroad via satellite. Star TVE HD is a pay television channel only available in HDTV in multichannel television providers in the Americas. Channels are also available on streaming, and its content on demand, on the RTVE Play online platform.

News services 
Telediario is the flagship television newscast produced by TVE's news services at its Torrespaña facilities in Madrid. Three Telediario editions a day are produced: the breakfast edition at 06:30 CET/CEST, the afternoon edition at 15:00 and the evening edition at 21:00; and they are simulcast live on La 1, on 24 Horas news channel, on TVE Internacional and on RTVE Play. Additional international editions are also produced and aired on TVE Internacional every day. TVE's territorial centers in every autonomous community produce and broadcast in regional variations in each of them, a shorter midday local bulletin on La 1 and RTVE Play. TVE's news services are also in charge of the 24-hour rolling news service of 24 Horas news channel and of the non-daily news programmes, such as Informe Semanal, of all its channels.

They are also in charge of La 2 Noticias ("The 2 News"), La 2's own national news bulletin, which began as an original nightly news bulletin in the late 1980s but it was turned into a breakfast news-programme in the mid-1990s and was later revamped as a nightly news bulletin, reverting to its original timeslot at 22:00. In 2015, La 2 Noticias moved to a later timeslot, 01:05.

Programming

References

External links 

 RTVE Corporation Official Site